Jasmine (stylized as JASMINE) is a Philippine mystery drama horror series broadcast by TV5, which produced it together with Ace Saatchi & Saatchi Advertising, Inc. (the Philippine affiliate of Saatchi & Saatchi Worldwide) and Unitel Productions Inc. It premiered on June 1, 2014 and airs every Sunday evenings at 9:15 PM, under the direction of Mark Meily.

Starting June 22, 2014, the Philippine mystery drama series will airs earlier every Sunday afternoon 5:00pm, and replays evening 10:00pm. The series ended on August 3, 2014.

Synopsis 
She is shooting her launching teleserye titled URLoved when she acquires a stalker called Maskara. Now Jasmine must find out who Maskara is. Can he be trusted? Is he just another creepy fan who wants a piece of her? How far is she willing to go to achieve her dream of fame and fortune? It's a fictional TV show about an actress making a TV show.

Cast 
Jasmine Curtis as Jasmine Carvajal - After a slew of critically acclaimed indie movies, actress Jasmine must now make the jump to mainstream media. Can she juggle her dreams of becoming a “serious actress” and the network's plans of turning her into their next big star?
Vin Abrenica as Alexis Vergara - Alexis, primetime prince of TV5, is “charming”, “lovable” and “down to earth”. He has been acting since he was a child and is now used to being in the spotlight.
Marvelous Alejo as Selina Pascual - Selina is a talented actress with extensive work in both the indie and mainstream films. She considers Jasmine to be her arch rival in the network, and is willing to go to extremes to get exactly what she wants.

Supporting Cast 
Gerard Sison as Miguel Asuncion - Young entrepreneur and next-in-line to the Asuncion political dynasty, Miguel is one of Jasmine's most persistent suitors. Ever since she broke up with her boyfriend, Miguel has been there for her, caring for her, squeezing his way into her heart. He is perfect “boyfriend material”. But is he too good to be true?
Nicole Estrada as Sarah Mae Miranda- A young, up and coming starlet, Sarah Mae is Selina's best friend. Sarah Mae is ambitious and talented, but her drive to prove herself to everyone often gets her in trouble.
Matt Padilla as Insp. Ramon Ramirez - He is a young, idealistic PNPA graduate who grew up in the slums of Manila. He takes his job seriously. Sometimes too seriously.
Alwyn Uytingco as Wendell Bautista - A fast-rising showbiz blogger, Wendell gets the scoop before anyone else does. He has befriended many celebrities, including Jasmine and he is growing in popularity in showbiz circles. How far will he go to dig dirt on his supposed friends in showbiz?
Justine Peña as Carly Peralta- Jasmine's feisty, frank, and loyal personal assistant. Always the voice of reason, she serves as Jasmine's friend, confidant, and conscience.
Cai Cortez as Mama Mia - She is a successful talent manager and Steven's rival. She and Steven used to be business partners until they had a falling-out. She always wanted to be Jasmine's manager but Steven beat her to it. She now manages Selina Pascual, Sarah Mae, and many new and established celebrities.
Carlo Orosa as Steven Yap - The successful, no-nonsense manager of Jasmine who wants to make her the next big star of TV5.
Jelson Bay as Insp. Emilio Osorio - Osorio thinks his partner Inspector Ramon Ramirez takes his job too seriously.
Meyanne Plamenio as Leila Alfonso- Leila is Steven's scatterbrained, loyal assistant.

Awards and nominations

See also 
 List of programs broadcast by TV5

References

External links 
 
 

Philippine drama television series
2014 Philippine television series debuts
2014 Philippine television series endings
TV5 (Philippine TV network) drama series
Mystery television series
Philippine horror fiction television series
Filipino-language television shows